Neoarachnotheca is a genus of fungi within the Onygenaceae family. This is a monotypic genus, containing the single species Neoarachnotheca keratinophila.

References

External links
 Neoarachnotheca at Index Fungorum

Eurotiomycetes
Monotypic Eurotiomycetes genera